Speleonectidae is a family of remipedes in the order Nectiopoda. There are at least two genera and about seven described species in Speleonectidae.

Genera
These two genera and seven species belong to the family Speleonectidae:
 Lasionectes Yager & Schram, 1986
 Lasionectes entrichoma Yager & Schram, 1986
 Speleonectes Yager, 1981
 Speleonectes epilimnius Yager & Carpenter, 1999
 Speleonectes gironensis Yager, 1994
 Speleonectes kakuki Daenekas, Iliffe, Yager & Koenemann, 2009
 Speleonectes lucayensis Yager, 1981
 Speleonectes minnsi Koenemann, Iliffe & van der Ham, 2003
 Speleonectes tanumekes Koenemann, Iliffe & van der Ham, 2003

Several former Speleonectes species have recently been transferred to other genera:

 Speleonectes atlantida (to Morlockia atlantida)
 Speleonectes benjamini (to Angirasu benjamini)
 Speleonectes tulumensis (to Xibalbanus tulumensis)

References

Further reading

 
 

Remipedia
Articles created by Qbugbot
Crustacean families